Gregory Zarian is an American film and television actor. He is best known for his recurring role as Reed Phillips in the HBO series Westworld and as Nate in the webseries Venice: The Series. He is also known for his role as Avi in the film 86 Melrose Avenue and as David in the film That's Amor.

Filmography

Film

Television

Awards and nominations

References

External links
 
 

Living people
American male film actors
21st-century American male actors
American male television actors
1986 births